The View UpStairs is a musical with music, lyrics and book by Max Vernon based on the real-life events of the 1973 arson attack at the UpStairs Lounge, a gay bar in New Orleans. This attack resulted in the deaths of 32 people, the deadliest attack on a gay club in U.S. history before the 2016 Orlando nightclub shooting. The show is inspired by and pays tributes to many of the patrons who frequented the venue.

The single-act show runs for approximately 1 hour and 45 minutes and is set entirely within the UpStairs Lounge.

Background
The show's score was composed by Max Vernon in 2013 and was first performed on June 24 of that year in a concert setting with performers such as Michael McElroy and Nathan Lee Graham (who eventually went on to originate the role of Willie) amongst others. The show then went into a workshop period in March 2016 under Invisible Wall Productions with Scott Ebersold as director and Matt Aument as musical director. The cast performed a benefit concert on July 11, 2016 for the victims and survivors of the Orlando nightclub shooting, with all proceeds going to the 'Equality Florida' institution.

Productions
The View UpStairs was first produced Off-Broadway by Invisible Wall Productions, and was also under the direction of Scott Ebersold. It began previews on February 15, 2017 at the Lynn Redgrave Theater in New York and officially premiered on February 26, before closing on May 21, 2017. It has since received a regional premiere in Richmond, Virginia and Los Angeles.

The show had its international premiere at the Hayes Theatre in Sydney, Australia, under the direction of Shaun Rennie. The show was put on as part of the 40th anniversary celebrations of the Sydney Gay and Lesbian Mardi Gras and began previews on 8 February 2018 before opening on 11 February. The sold out season of 33 performances concluded on 11 March 2018.

Following the success of prior productions of the musical, several US regional productions were scheduled for the 2018–2019 season including: 
Circle Theatre's production in Chicago from 22 June to 22 July 2018
Out Front Theatre Company's production in Atlanta from 25 October to 19 November 2018
The Desert Rose Playhouse production in Palm Springs from 8 to 29 March 2019
New Conservatory Theatre Company's production in San Francisco from 10 May to 9 June 2019
Good Company Theatre's production in Ogden from 7 to 23 June 2019
Uptown Players' production in Dallas from 21 June to 7 July 2019
SpeakEasy Stage Company's production in Boston from 31 May to 22 June 2019
Evolution Theatre Inc's production in Columbus from 17 to 27 July 2019

The show had its European premiere at the Soho Theatre in London. This production was directed by Jonathan O’Boyle and ran from 18 July to 24 August 2019.

In February 2022 the show had its first run in Japan. This production was translated, adapted, directed and choreographed by Yojiro Ichikawa.

Characters

Casts

Musical numbers
The Original Off-Broadway Cast recording was released on 11 August 2017.

 "Some Kind of Paradise" - Buddy, Company
 "#householdname" - Wes
 "Lost and Found" - Buddy, Company
 "What I Did Today" - Patrick
 "Are You Listening, God?" - Company
 "The World Outside These Walls" - Henri, Company
 "Completely Overdone" - Inez, Company
 "The Future is Great" - Wes, Company
 "Waltz" - Patrick, Company
 "Sex on Legs" - Freddy, Company
 "Better Than Silence" - Dale
 "The Most Important Thing" - Inez, Company
 "Crazy Notion" - Wes, Patrick, Company
 "Theme Song" - Willie, Company
 "And I Wish"‡  - Patrick
 "The View UpStairs" - Wes, Company

‡ Cut song that is optional to put back in the show

Awards and nominations

Original Off-Broadway production
Source: Lortel.org

Sydney production

References

External links
 

2017 musicals
LGBT-related musicals
Musicals inspired by real-life events
Off-Broadway musicals
One-act musicals
Plays set in the 1970s
Plays set in New Orleans